Mohammad Nazim Khilji (born 1 January 1984) is an Indian model and actor recognized for his work in Hindi television. He made his television debut with Shaurya Aur Suhani. He rose to prominence playing Ahem Parag  Modi and Jaggi Parag Modi in Star Plus's popular soap opera Saath Nibhaana Saathiya (2010–17), one of the longest running shows in India In 2020, Nazim reprised the same double role in Saath Nibhaana Saathiya 2 in order to promote the show. From August 2021 to June 2022, Nazim played the main male lead of Saksham Modi in Star Bharat's Tera Mera Saath Rahe.

Early life
Nazim was born on 1 January 1984 in Malerkotla, Punjab. Television actors Anas Rashid and Ather Habib are his cousins.

Career

Early days and breakthrough (2009–17)
Nazim made his entry into Hindi television industry with an unknown role on Star Plus's fantasy based series Shaurya Aur Suhani, created by Sphere Origins, in 2009 and then signed an episodic of Sony Entertainment Television's crime thriller CID in 2010.

His biggest breakthrough came when he bagged his first lead role as Ahem Modi for continuously six years (2010–16) in Star Plus's one of the most popular soap operas, Saath Nibhaana Saathiya opposite Devoleena Bhattacharjee. In 2015, he also debuted into Bollywood with the horror film Plot No. 666. He was a contestant on Box Cricket League too.

In May 2016, Nazim quit Saath Nibhaana Saathiya as he didn't wanted to play a maternal grandfather onscreen. However, in August 2016, he returned to the show playing a new character of Ahem's legitimate twin brother Jaggi Modi and remained present in it until its off air in July 2017. Venturing into Punjabi cinema, he appeared in the Punjabi film Big Daddy (2017).

Further works (2017–present)

In August 2018, Nazim reteamed with Bhattacharjee in an episodic of &TV's Laal Ishq. Few days later, he found his first antagonistic role in Colors TV's well performing drama series Udaan Sapnon Ki as Gumaan Singh Rajvanshi before his role ended the very next month. In January 2019, he was seen opposite Sreejita De in another episodic of Laal Ishq.

That same month, Nazim entered Colors TV's Roop - Mard Ka Naya Swaroop as the vengeful Samru Singh Vaghela. In July 2019, he joined the same channel's love-triangle Bahu Begum as the greedy and evil Asgar Akhtar Mirza. He quitted the show in November 2019 amicably.

On 19th October 2020, Nazim reprised his role as Ahem Modi and Jaggi Modi for the first 31 episodes of Saath Nibhaana Saathiya 2, until 23rd November 2020, and  reunited with Bhattacharjee. 

From August 2021 to June 2022, Nazim played the main male lead role Saksham Modi in Star Bharat's Tera Mera Saath Rahe.

Television

Filmography

Discography

Awards

References

External links 

 
 

1986 births
Living people
People from Punjab, India
Indian male television actors
Indian male soap opera actors
Male actors in Punjabi cinema